= German ethnic =

German ethnic can refer to:

- Germans
- Volksdeutsche
